Wilson Elso Goñi (1938–2009) was a Uruguayan politician belonging to the National Party.

He served as mayor of Treinta y Tres Department (1985-1989 and 2000–2005).

1938 births
2009 deaths
National Party (Uruguay) politicians
Uruguayan vice-presidential candidates
Ministers of Transport and Public Works of Uruguay